Mizunuma (written:  lit. "water marsh") is a Japanese surname. Notable people with the surname include:

, Japanese footballer
, Japanese swimmer
, Japanese footballer and manager

See also
Mizunuma Station, a railway station in Kiryū, Gunma Prefecture, Japan
6414 Mizunuma, a main-belt asteroid

Japanese-language surnames